Kotturu is a town panchayath and taluk in the Vijayanagara district of the Indian state of Karnataka. It was the home of Guru Kottureshwara, a 15th-century Shaivite saint. Every year, over 200,000 people congregate during the car festival (rathotsava) held in February.

Kotturu is legendary for a dish called mandakki-menasinakayi, a mixture of puffed rice with savories, accompanied by chili pepper fritters. The chilli peppers are slit along their lengths, stuffed with a condiment of salt and crushed cumin, dipped in lentil batter, and deep-fried.

Historically, Kotturu was well-known for its cotton gin industry and as the terminus of a train route from Hospet.  In 2019, that railway line was extended to Harihara and upgraded to the meter gauge.

History
Kottur is named after Saint Kottureshwara, so its history stems from the history of Guru Kottureshwara. Legend has it that, when the Lingayath Dharma was leaning towards Vedic Sanathana style, to refine and to create awareness about Basavadi pranitha sharana Dharma to people and to make them understand about shatsthala, Ashtavarana Lord Kottureswara spent his lifetime here. That is why devotees call him as Astavarana Tatvopadeshi Guru. It is believed that he placed in his heart all the people and solved everyone's problems.

The Virasaiva religion was brought into practice by Lord Basavanna in the 12th century and lord Kottureswara was the continuity of same sharana parampare established by Basavanna and sharanas. Kottu or Kodu in Kannada means give and Eshwar means God (Kotu + Eshwara= Kottureshwara). No one knows about the birth and childhood of Kottureswara, but he reached Shikhapura at a young age. He travelled from North Kashmir to Kanyakumari. During the ruling of Akbar in Delhi, Lord Kottureswar appeared in the bedroom of Akbar's wife as an Old saint and blessed her. Hearing the voice of the old man, the guard informed this to the emperor. Akbar in anger came in to the queen's bedroom and saw the mid aged person sleeping in the queen's bed. For the Queen Kottureshwara appeared as a saint and for Akbar he appeared as an ordinary man. In his fury, he attacked Kottureshwar with sword but to his astonishment the sword became a flower Garland. By this Akbar realized his mistake and surrendered to the Lord. Lord Kottureshwar blessed Akbar and the Rajput queen. Akbar presented Lord Kottureshwar with his Sword and the Cot on which lord Kottureshwara was sleeping. This Cot is located at Gachchina Mutt of Kotturu even now. He also offered him Sarsipura or Shikapura an independent territory which was under his ruling.

Lord Kottureswara's temples are divided into 4 shrines in Kottur 
Murkalmutt (3 stone shrine)
Thotalmutt (shrine with cradle)
Darbarmutt or Doddamutt (king assembly shrine or big shrine)
Gachina mutt (shrine where saint returns kailsa by meditating)

In first mutt is the one where the Lord appeared first in the land of Kotturu.
Second mutt is where the lord blessed a child. Third Is the mutt where he used give sadare (preaching on religion) and solve the problems of the people. The fourth is the mutt where Guru Kottureswara entered Ikya Stala the final stage of Shudstala (Yoga Samadhi).

There is another story related to the Gachhina mutt. Earlier this used to be a temple of Lord Veerabhadra. Once people started visiting Lord Kottureswara to get the blessings, and begin to lessen the worship of lord Veerabhadra. Lord Veerabhadra complained about this to Lord Kottureshwara. Then the guru asked him to occupy another place called Kodathgudda where Lord Veerabhadra's temple is situated now. This is also an equally famous temple in this region.

Lord Kottureshwara visited a village near Mysuru and noticed the devotion of a priest in the temple (named Karilingeswara). He requested him to come with him and be his disciple and henceforth the priest of the temple in Kotturu. There is also a saying that he ordered only the children from his family should to be the priests for the forthcoming generations. Hence to take care of the priest's family a land was given in the nearby village called K. Ayyanahalli. There is a temple dedicated to Karilingeswara in this village. Some of the descendants of his family continue to do the worship at the Hiremath and stay in this village.

In memory of Lord Kottureshwara, devotees name their sons as Kotresh and daughters as Kotturamma. These names are commonly found in and around Kotturu.

There is an annual fair which happens just before MahaShivaratri. Devotees from all over assemble to witness the fair and the car festival. Some of the devotees even reach Kottur by walk from their native place. During the month of December there will be Karthikotsava.

There is a temple of Kotturamma (Parvathi) on the outskirts of Kottur. Kotturamma is neither the wife or related to Lord Kottureshwara but a form of Goddess Parvathi. The Karnam family of Kottur maintains the temple. There is a festival in every August where in which lakhs of people attend the festival. The place is famed by a veteran theater person Kotturappa, a legendary actor, whose performance in the role of Danashoora Karna is widely known throughout Karnataka. Deshi, Devaramane Shivanandappa, is the first Writer from this place who was also a sub editor of the local daily, RAITA, from Bellary. Bhadrashhetty Sanna Rudrappa, Gorali Sharanappa, Dr. Alabur Nanjappa are a few freedom fighters from this place.

Geography
It has an average elevation of 587 metres (1925 feet).

Demographics
 India census, Kottur had a population of 22,667. Males constitute 52% of the population and females 48%. Kotturu has an average literacy rate of 69%, higher than the national average of 59.5%: male literacy is 76%, and female literacy is 61%. In Kotturu, 12% of the population is under 6 years of age.

Transport
Currently, there is only one express train through Kotturu, which connects Hosapete to Davanagere. A new train is to be started from Vijayapura to Yeshwanthpur via Kotturu every night from September.

References

External links

Cities and towns in Vijayanagara district